The 2011 South Staffordshire District Council election to the South Staffordshire District Council took place on Thursday 5 May 2011. A total of 49 seats were up for election, 42 of which went to the Conservative Party, mirroring the 2007 elections.

Election result

Ward results

References

2011 English local elections
2011
2010s in Staffordshire